Graeme James Dey (born 29 October 1962) is a Scottish politician who served as Minister for Transport from 2021 to 2022, having previously served as Minister for Parliamentary Business and Veterans from 2018 to 2021. A member of the Scottish National Party (SNP), he has been Member of the Scottish Parliament (MSP) for Angus South since 2011.

Career 
Dey is a journalist, having worked for DC Thomson since 1980 and serving as sports editor of The Courier. From 2001 to 2017, he served as MP Mike Weir's election agent, managing successful campaigns in 2001, 2005, and 2010.

Politics 

At the 2011 Scottish Parliament election, Dey was elected as MSP for Angus South with 16,164 votes (58.5% of total), a 38.3% majority. He served as Deputy Convener of the Parliament's Rural Affairs, Climate Change and Environment (RACCE) Committee during its scrutiny of the Land Reform Bill 2015.

Dey was re-elected in 2016.  On 27 June 2018, he was appointed as Minister for Parliamentary Business and Veterans, a junior post in Nicola Sturgeon's Scottish Government.

After the election in May 2021, he was appointed on 20 May 2021 as Minister for Transport.

In January 2022, Dey tendered his resignation as Transport Minister for health reasons.

References

External links 
 
 personal website
 profile at SNP.org

1962 births
Living people
Members of the Scottish Parliament 2011–2016
Scottish National Party MSPs
Members of the Scottish Parliament 2016–2021
Members of the Scottish Parliament 2021–2026